Richard Lee Fale (born March 27, 1981, in Provo, Utah) is an American politician and a Republican member of the Hawaii House of Representatives since January 16, 2013 representing District 47.

Elections
2013 Representative Richard Fale voted against SB 1, which legalized same-sex marriage in Hawaii, during the special legislative fall 2013 session that ended in November.
2012 With Democratic Representative Jessica Wooley redistricted to District 48, Fale challenged incumbent Republican Representative Gil Riviere, who had been redistricted from District 46. Fale won the District 47 August 11, 2012 Republican Primary with 727 votes (50.5%) against Riviere, and won the November 6, 2012 General election with 4,381 votes (54.0%) against Democratic nominee D. Ululani Beirne. who had been redistricted from District 38.
2008 Fale initially challenged incumbent Democratic Senator Clayton Hee in the Hawaii Senate District 23, was unopposed for the September 20, 2008 Republican Primary, winning with 1,133 votes, but lost the November 4, 2008 General election to Hee.
2010 Fale challenged incumbent Democratic Representative Jessica Wooley in House District 47, was unopposed for the September 18, 2010 Republican Primary, winning with 895 votes, but lost the November 2, 2010 General election to Wooley.

References

External links
Official page at the Hawaii State Legislature
Campaign site
 

1981 births
Living people
Brigham Young University–Hawaii alumni
Hawaii politicians of Filipino descent
Republican Party members of the Hawaii House of Representatives
Politicians from Provo, Utah
Windward Community College alumni
American politicians of Filipino descent
Asian-American people in Hawaii politics
21st-century American politicians
Asian conservatism in the United States